North Bend School District (13) is a public school district that serves the city of North Bend, Oregon, United States. It came to national attention in 2018, when the Oregon Department of Education's report found that LGBT high school students in the district were subjected to systematic harassment and given the Bible to read as punishment.

Demographics
In the 2009 school year, the district had 73 students classified as homeless by the Department of Education, or 3.0% of students in the district.

Schools

Elementary schools
Hillcrest Elementary School
North Bay Elementary School

Middle school
North Bend Middle School

High school
North Bend High School

Charter schools
Lighthouse School (grades kindergarten-eight)
Oregon Coast Technology School (grades six- twelve) (ORCO Tech will no longer exist at the end of the 2015–2016 school year)

References

External links
 

School districts in Oregon
Education in Coos County, Oregon
North Bend, Oregon